Bobbi Harlow is a fictional character in Berke Breathed's comic strip Bloom County.

A schoolteacher, Bobbi is popular among her students, particularly Milo Bloom and Michael Binkley, who both harbored crushes on her. However, the conservative adults in the town are suspicious of her liberal, feminist views. Their suspicions turn to outrage when she brings her left-wing, radical feminist politics into the classroom, such as having the students wear gas masks in case "the fascists" (or, as the children called them "fishes") tear gassed them, throwing fake blood at "the war mongerers" ("war monkeys" in kid-speak) and teaching them about women's liberation. Bobbi originally starts dating Steve Dallas, but is swept off her feet (figuratively and literally) by Cutter John.

Bobbi started out as a major recurring character in the strip, but as time went on her role became more and more limited. As the strip began to focus more on children and animal characters (with the notable exception of Steve), there was less room for Bobbi. By 1983, she was gone completely, without explanation.

Bobbi Harlow's last appearance in the original Bloom County was in a 1988 a Sunday strip, where it was revealed that she had joined the staff of Donahue in 1983, and then shaved her head in despair over the failure of the Equal Rights Amendment, and cut off her right ear after Geraldine Ferraro's unsuccessful vice-presidential campaign.

References

Harlow, Bobbi
Harlow, Bobbi
Comics characters introduced in 1980